The Teller Amendment was an amendment to a joint resolution of the United States Congress, enacted on April 20, 1898, in reply to President William McKinley's War Message. It placed a condition on the United States military's presence in Cuba. According to the clause, the U.S. could not annex Cuba but only leave "control of the island to its people." In short, the U.S. would help Cuba gain independence and then withdraw all its troops from the country.

McKinley's war message
In the political atmosphere in the U.S. growing out of the Cuban struggle for independence, and following on the February 15, 1898, sinking of the USS Maine in Havana harbor President William McKinley, on 11 April 1898, asked the Congress,

... to authorize and empower the President to take measures to secure a full and final termination of hostilities between the government of Spain and the people of Cuba, and to ensure in the island the establishment of a stable government, capable of maintaining order and observing its international obligations, ensuring peace and tranquillity and the security of its citizens as well as our own, and to use the military and naval forces of the United States as may be necessary for these purposes.

Congressional response
Congress debated a joint resolution in response to the president's request for a week. In near-final form, its three parts constituted:

The Teller Amendment
Senator Henry M. Teller, a Republican from Colorado (who had switched parties after leading a revolt against the dominant gold-favoring party wing at the 1896 Republican National Convention) proposed the amendment to ensure that the United States would not establish permanent control over Cuba following the cessation of hostilities with Spain. The Republican McKinley administration would not recognize belligerency or independence as it was unsure of the form an insurgency government might take. Without recognizing some government in Cuba, Congressmen feared McKinley was simply priming the island for annexation. The Teller clause quelled any anxiety of annexation by stating that the United States

... hereby disclaims any disposition of intention to exercise sovereignty, jurisdiction, or control over said island except for pacification thereof, and asserts its determination, when that is accomplished, to leave the government and control of the island to its people.

The proposed amendment gained support from several forces:

... those who opposed annexing territory containing large numbers of blacks and Catholics, those who sincerely supported Cuban independence, and representatives of the domestic sugar business, including sponsor Senator Henry Teller of Colorado, who feared Cuban competition. 

(A significant import tariff on foreign sugar would be removed should Cuba be annexed.)

The Senate passed the amendment by voice vote, then passed the amended version of the resolution 42 to 35, on April 19, 1898, and the House concurred the same day, 311 to 6. President McKinley signed the joint resolution on April 20, 1898, and the ultimatum was forwarded to Spain.

The Spanish–American War lasted from April 25 to August 12, 1898, and it ended with the Treaty of Paris on December 10, 1898. As a result, Spain lost control over the remains of its overseas empire consisting of Cuba, Puerto Rico, the Philippine islands, Guam and other islands.

After Spanish troops left the island in December 1898, the United States occupied Cuba until 1902, and as promised in the Teller Amendment did not attempt to annex the island. However, under the Platt Amendment, crafted in 1901 by U.S. Secretary of War Elihu Root to replace the Teller Amendment, important decisions of the government of Cuba remained subject to override by the United States. This suzerainty bred resentment toward the U.S.

According to Gregory Weeks, author of U.S. and Latin American Relations (Peason, 2008, p. 56), "The Teller Amendment, authored by a Colorado Senator who wanted to make sure that Cuba's sugar would not compete with his state's crop of beet sugar, prohibited the president annexing Cuba."

See also
 Monroe Doctrine
 Cuba–United States relations
 History of Cuba
 Sphere of influence
 Spanish–American War
 Protectorate
 Imperialism
 Platt Amendment

References

External links
 
 
 
 
 
 
 

History of the foreign relations of the United States
Spanish–American War
Cuba–United States relations
1898 in Cuba
1898 in American law
1898 in American politics
Spanish colonial period of Cuba